Mohammad Pur Janata High School (Bengali: মোহাম্মদপুর জনতা  উচ্চ বিদ্যালয়) is a high school located in the Mohammadpur town of Chatkhil Upazila, Noakhali District, Bangladesh.It was founded in 1971

হাসিবুল ইসলাম শান্ত  এই ইস্কুলের একজন অনিয়মিত ছাএ ছিলেন

References 

Schools in Noakhali District
Chatkhil Upazila